The Return of Sandokan is a 1996 television series produced by Germany (where it was released as Die Rückkehr des Sandokan) and Italy (where is known as Il ritorno di Sandokan). It is a sequel to the 1976 Sandokan television series starring Kabir Bedi. Bedi had also appeared in a 1977 spin-off film La tigre è ancora viva: Sandokan alla riscossa!.

It was followed in 1998 by another sequel The Son of Sandokan, featuring Sandokan and his son.

Cast
 Kabir Bedi as Sandokan
 Mandala Tayde as Lady Dora Parker
 Fabio Testi as Yanez De Gomera
 Romina Power as Maharani Surama
 Tobias Hoesl as James Guilford
 Randi Ingerman as Yamira
 Mathieu Carrière as Raska
 Vittoria Belvedere as Baba
 Lorenzo Crespi as André De Gomera
 Friedrich von Thun as Lord Parker
 Clive Riche as Alfred Higgins
 Franco Nero as Yogi Azim
 Jackie Basehart as Sir Burton
  Denzil Smith as Village Headman

Reception

The Return of Sandokan received negative criticism from television critics.

See also
 Sandokan (1976 television series)

References

External links
 

1996 Italian television series debuts
1996 Italian television series endings
Television shows based on works by Emilio Salgari
Films directed by Enzo G. Castellari
Television series set in the 19th century
Television shows set in Malaysia
Italian television series
Films scored by Guido & Maurizio De Angelis
Television series about pirates